The Dogwood Invitational is an amateur golf championship played annually at Druid Hills Golf Club in Atlanta, Georgia. Established in 1941, the goal of the Dogwood is to promote the game of amateur golf and support junior golf organizations. The tournament is run by The Dogwood Foundation, a 501(c)3 nonprofit. The Dogwood Invitation has consistently been a "Category B" tournament in the World Amateur Golf Ranking which means that it is one of the top 150 men's events world-wide based on strength-of-field.

The 18-hole, par-72 course at Druid Hills is 6,860 yards from the Dogwood Tees with a slope of 139 and 73.5 rating. The field is created via invitation only and is supplemented with an 18-hole open qualifier, during tournament week. Golfers are required to have a USGA handicap index of seven or lower in order to be considered for participation in the qualifier.

Beneficiaries of the monies raised during the Dogwood include the Atlanta Junior Golf Association, who holds more than 90 tournaments and golf training programs for children aged 7–16 in the metro-Atlanta area and The Wayne Reynolds Scholarship Foundation, which awards annual grants for four years to deserving junior golfers in the state of Georgia attending accredited colleges or universities.

The Dogwood Champion receives exemptions into the Canadian Amateur and Master of the Amateurs in Australia.

Winners

2022 Carson Bacha
2021 Louis Dobbelaar
2020 No tournament
2019 Brandon Mancheno
2018 Ashton Poole
2017 Lloyd Jefferson Go
2016 Charles Huntzinger
2015 Dawson Armstrong
2014 Trey Rule
2013 Michael Johnson
2012 Ben Kohles
2011 Nate McCoy
2010 Andrew Yun
2009 Brian Harman
2008 Rory Hie
2007 Webb Simpson
2006 Hudson Swafford
2005 Stuart Moore
2004 Chris Nallen
2003 Lee Williams
2002 Andrew Buckle
2001 Kyle Thompson
2000 B. J. Staten
1999 Chris Morris
1998 Michael Kirk
1997 Steve Scott
1996 Robert Floyd
1995 Justin Roof
1994 Allen Doyle
1973–1993 No tournament
1972 Tom Evans
1971 Bill Harvey
1970 Allen Miller
1968–1969 No tournament
1967 Bill Harvey
1966 Charlie Harrison
1965 Vinny Giles
1964 Jack Penrose
1963 Vinny Giles
1962 Gene Dahlbender
1961 Gene Dahlbender
1960 Chuck Kocsis
1959 Jack Penrose
1958 Gene Dahlbender
1957 Gene Dahlbender
1956 Gene Dahlbender
1955 Tommy Barnes
1954 Frank Stevenson, Jr.
1953 Harvie Ward
1952 Harvie Ward
1951 Tommy Barnes
1950 Arnold Blum
1949 Tommy Barnes
1948 Tommy Barnes
1947 Gene Dahlbender
1946 Gene Dahlbender
1943–1945 No tournament
1942 Dan Yates, Sr.
1941 Tommy Barnes

References

External links

Amateur golf tournaments in the United States
Golf in Georgia (U.S. state)
Sports competitions in Atlanta
1941 establishments in Georgia (U.S. state)